Golden period may refer to:

Golden hour (medicine)
Golden hour (photography)
Golden Age (disambiguation)
Golden Time (disambiguation)